Wayne M. Catalano (born July 24, 1956 in New Orleans, Louisiana) is a former jockey and current trainer in American Thoroughbred horse racing who has won three Breeders' Cup World Championship races and trained two Eclipse Award Champions.

Jockey career
Wayne Catalano began riding in 1974, learning the business under U.S. Racing Hall of Fame trainer Jack Van Berg. In 1977 Catalano won 349 races, finishing second to Steve Cauthen in the national standings. Knee injuries ended his riding career in mid April 1983 after having won 1,792 races.

Training career
Catalano immediately turned to training after his riding career ended. Working from a base in Chicago, he won his first training title in 1987 at Hawthorne Race Course and earned another in 1989 and again in 2004. He won back-to-back training titles in 1988-1989 at Sportsman's Park Racetrack and between 2000 and 2010 won nine training titles at Arlington Park.

In 2006, Wayne Catalano won the Breeders' Cup Juvenile Fillies with Dreaming of Anna and a second time in 2008 with She Be Wild. Both were voted American Champion Two-Year-Old Filly honors.
In 2011, Catalano won his third Breeders Cup event, capturing the Breeders' Cup Juvenile Fillies Turf with Stephanie's Kitten.

References

1956 births
Living people
American jockeys
American horse trainers
Sportspeople from New Orleans